Bazik is a village in the municipality of Domaljevac-Šamac, Posavina Canton, Bosnia and Herzegovina.

Demographics 
According to the 2013 census, its population was 493.

References

Populated places in Domaljevac